Aldern Bridge is a hamlet in Hampshire, United Kingdom.

Governance
The village of Adbury is part of the civil parish of Burghclere, and is part of the Burghclere, Highclere and St. Mary Bourne ward of Basingstoke and Deane borough council. The borough council is a Non-metropolitan district of Hampshire County Council.

References

Villages in Hampshire